Joseph is a 2018 Indian Malayalam-language crime thriller film directed by M. Padmakumar and written by Shahi Kabir. It stars Joju George, Dileesh Pothan, Irshad, Athmiya Rajan, Johny Antony, Sudhi Koppa, Malavika Menon, and Madhuri Braganza. The story, an investigation thriller, develops through the life of four retired policemen. Some scenes in movie (the double crime scene in beginning) is based on real life experience from the writer, Shahi Kabir. Joju won the Kerala State Film Award for Best Character Actor  and also won Special Mention in the National Awards. The film was remade in Tamil as Visithiran (2022), in Telugu as Sekhar (2022), and in Kannada as Ravi Bopanna (2022). A Hindi remake is also being made with Sunny Deol in the lead.

Plot 
Joseph, a retired detective with sharp investigating skills, lives a lonely life, and is separated from his wife Stella, who is now married to another cop named Peter. One day, Joseph is called by SP Venugopal to investigate a crime scene involving the murder of an old couple. He reaches the crime scene and begins his investigation. Upon questioning the people present at the crime scene, it is revealed that a person named Manu was the first to witness the incident when he came to supply milk to their house and was also the one who informed the police. 

After questioning the members present at the crime scene, Joseph deduces that Manu is the culprit and arrests him. Few days later, Joseph learns that Stella met with an accident and rushes to the hospital to enquire about her condition. His friends find out that Joseph still has love for Stella and then enquires about the reason for separation. Joseph reveals that few years earlier, when he went to investigate a crime scene, while examining the corpse, he was shocked to find out that the corpse was of his ex-girlfriend Lisamma, and her death really haunted him to the extent that he was afraid to reveal this fact to Stella, which rendered him alcoholic and caused the separation. Later, Stella is declared brain dead and is requested for the donation of her organs by the doctor.

Joseph and his friends reaches the spot where Stella met with the accident, and receives the car number from the tea shop owner, who also describe the incident as seen by him. Joseph guesses that the car number would be a fake, which proved to be true. Joseph finds out that when Stella fell, her forearm would have received maximum injury and would be less chances for a head injury to happen. Joseph tracks all the second hand used cars of the car model recognized by the eyewitness and traces its ID. He also made sure that an eyewitness is present in order to make the case a-hit-and-run rather than a murder. Joseph tells his friends that a crime happens within 48 hours after a new SIM card is taken by the lady who traveled in the car. 

Meanwhile, Joseph visits a girl for whom his daughter's heart was transplanted and finds her sick before the transplantation. Joseph tells the girl's mother to meet his cardiologist friend for checking up the girl's persisting sickness. Joseph tracks some information about a new second used car that got sold in the hospital locality and arranges his friends to follow it, but on the day when the black used car comes out, Josephs friends' car gets punctured and they were unable to follow that car. His friends try to call Joseph but doesn't pick up the phone. Joseph travels in his bike, mimicking the accident happened to Stella, is hit down and picked up by the couple in the black used car. 

At the court, the advocate tells that Joseph has provided strong evidence of the crime conducted in the name of organ transplantation for 1 crore from each hospital for organ transplant in the place of 10 lakhs profit made if the patient is to be treated to become well. It is revealed that Joseph's bike fitted with a camera at its rear which records the event. The killers' jeep comes and hits him down and is being picked up by a couple in a black used car. Inside the car, a camera which was earlier fitted by Joseph's friend shows the female hitting Joseph's head with a hammer rendering him brain damaged and finally gets operated in the operation theater as an organ donor.

It is revealed that Joseph was told by his cardiologist friend that the aforementioned transplantation had no effect for the girl as if it was not done. Joseph tracked some big hospital records which show transplantation was done for foreigners on the same day that his daughter's organ was donated and Stella's organs were also donated to a foreigner. Joseph found a high priority list for AB group which was matching his own group, to come under the focus of the hospital in killing him. Joseph conducted a trial suicide previously by cutting his vein and getting admitted in the hospital for listing himself as a possible donor of the rare group. Joseph was spied on by the hospital's arranged killers to watch his daily activities. 

Finally, Joseph punctures his friend's car by himself so that the crime gets conducted in the usual manner, gets recorded and full evidence should be recorded intact. Later, Joseph dedication for exposing the crime conducted by the hospital for organ transplantation gets appreciated, and Peter receives the medal in the name of Joseph.

Cast

Music
The songs were composed by Ranjin Raj and Bhagyaraj (Pandu Paadavarambathiloode), while the film score was composed by Anil Johnson

Release 
The film was released on 16 November 2018.

Box office 
Joseph was commercial success and ran for 125 days in theatres.

Controversy 
The film was criticised by Indian Medical Association for depicting a plot which included murder of potential donors for the sake of organ transplantation scam, on the backdrop of reducing numbers of organ transplantation in Kerala during recent years mainly due to stricter laws.
In an interview to The Hindu, the writer Shahi Kabir responded that he didn't intend to create a scare about Mrithasanjeevani [Kerala Network for Organ Sharing, a project of the State Government], but an attempt to prevent a crime. He narrowed on the topic after several discussions about organ donation in public platforms including social media.

Awards

References

External links
 

2018 films
2010s Malayalam-language films
Indian thriller drama films
Malayalam films remade in other languages
Films directed by M. Padmakumar